Windowpane or paned window may refer to:
Paned window (architecture), an architectural element
Paned window (computing), a graphical user interface divided into discrete areas
Windowpane (song), a 1991 song by Coil from Love's Secret Domain
"Windowpane", a 2003 song by Opeth from Damnation
Windowpane, the structure of [4,4,4,4]Fenestrane
Windowpane, a piece of gelatin containing LSD

See also
Windowpane coconut or Beccariophoenix madagascariensis, a flowering plant in the family Arecaceae
Windowpane flounder (Scophthalmus aquosus), a fish from the family Scophthalmidae
Windowpane oyster, a bivalve marine mollusk in the family Placunidae
Windowpane plaid, a way of crossing warp and weft to create a pattern